The 2021 United States Grand Prix (officially known as the Formula 1 Aramco United States Grand Prix 2021) was a Formula One motor race, held on October 24, 2021, at the Circuit of the Americas in Austin, Texas, United States. The race was the 17th round of the 2021 Formula One World Championship and the 50th running of the United States Grand Prix, the 42nd time the race was run as a World Championship event since the inaugural  season, and the ninth time a World Championship round was held at the Circuit of the Americas in Austin, Texas.

Background

The race returned after being cancelled in  due to the COVID-19 pandemic. There was a 20% risk of rain for qualifying and 40% for the race. From this race onward, any practice times set during waved yellow flags would be deleted. The final two rounds of the 2021 W Series were held as support races for the Grand Prix. This was the ninth time that Austin has hosted a Formula One Grand Prix. Some restrictions on paddock access related to the COVID-19 pandemic were lowered starting from this event.

Championship standings before the race 
After finishing second in the preceding Turkish Grand Prix, Max Verstappen led the drivers' championship from Lewis Hamilton by six points, Verstappen with 262.5 and Hamilton with 256.5. Behind them, Valtteri Bottas was in third place with 177 points. Lando Norris trailed him by 32 points, and Sergio Pérez trailed Norris by 10 points. In the constructors' championship, Mercedes led Red Bull Racing by 36 points. Behind them, third-placed McLaren led fourth-placed Ferrari by 7.5 points with 240 points, with Alpine a distant fifth with 104 points.

Entrants 

The drivers and teams were the same as the season entry list with no additional stand-in drivers for the race.

The title sponsor of Ferrari, Mission Winnow, returned for this race. For this weekend exclusively, Honda-powered teams Red Bull Racing and Scuderia AlphaTauri raced with sponsorship by Honda's American brand Acura, replacing the engine manufacturer's logos in their cars' respective liveries.

Tyre choices 
Sole tyre supplier Pirelli allocated the C2, C3, and C4 compounds of tyre to be used in the race.

Practice
The first practice session started at 11:30 local time (UTC−05:00) on Friday, October 22. Valtteri Bottas was the fastest in the session, with Lewis Hamilton and Max Verstappen behind. The second session started at 15:00 local time, also on Friday, and ended with Sergio Pérez fastest ahead of Lando Norris and Hamilton. The third practice session started at 13:00 local time on Saturday, October 23. There were very stiff winds and high temperatures catching the drivers out throughout the session and Verstappen and Hamilton both had quicker lap times deleted for exceeding track limits on Turns 19 and 9, respectively, Pérez was once again the fastest driver, ahead of Carlos Sainz Jr. for Ferrari and Verstappen.

Qualifying 
Qualifying started at 16:00  local time (UTC−05:00) on Saturday, October 23. Before qualifying, Red Bull made alterations to the rear wings of their cars after a crack was found on one of them. Verstappen qualified on pole. Hamilton qualified second, a fifth of a second slower than Verstappen. Pérez qualified third, while Bottas qualified fourth, although the latter had a five-place grid penalty and was relegated to ninth on the starting grid.

Qualifying classification 

Notes
  – Valtteri Bottas received a five-place grid penalty for a new internal combustion engine.
  – Sebastian Vettel was required to start the race from the back of the grid for exceeding his quota of power unit elements.
  – Fernando Alonso was required to start the race from the back of the grid for exceeding his quota of power unit elements. 
  – George Russell was required to start the race from the back of the grid for exceeding his quota of power unit elements.

Race 
The race started at 14:00 local time (UTC−05:00) on Sunday, October 24, and was run over fifty-six laps.

Race classification 

Notes
  – Includes one point for fastest lap.

Championship standings after the race

Drivers' Championship standings

Constructors' Championship standings

 Note: Only the top five positions are included for both sets of standings.
 Bold text indicates competitors who still had a theoretical chance of becoming World Champion.

See also

 2021 W Series Austin round

Notes

References

External links 

United States
United States Grand Prix
Grand Prix
United States Grand Prix
United States Grand Prix